ETA Creative Arts Foundation, founded in 1971, is an African-American theatre and art museum in Chicago.

References

External links 
 Official site
 https://www.chicagoreader.com/chicago/sons-and-fathers-of-sons/Content?oid=871965

Theatres in Chicago
Art museums and galleries in Illinois
1971 establishments in the United States
African-American theatre